The 2011 season is the Puerto Rico Islanders 8th season over all and their 1st season in the North American Soccer League. This article shows player statistics and all matches that the club have and will play during the 2011 season.

Club

Technical staff

Kit

Squad

First Team squad
As of September 13, 2011.

Transfers

In

Out

Match results

North American Soccer League

CFU Club championship

CONCACAF Champions League

Standings

References

2011
American soccer clubs 2011 season
2011 North American Soccer League season
Islanders